The Welland Pirates were a minor league baseball team located in Welland, Ontario.  The team played in the Short-Season A classification New York–Penn League from 1989 to 1994, and were affiliated with the Pittsburgh Pirates. Their home stadium was Welland Stadium.

When the Welland Pirates relocated to Erie, Pennsylvania, in 1995, they were renamed the Erie SeaWolves, who exist today as a member of the Double-A Eastern League.

Notable alumni

 Jeff Banister (1994, MGR) 2015 AL Manager of the Year
 Jason Christiansen (1991)
 Jason Johnson (1993) 
Tim Wakefield (1989) MLB All-Star; 200 MLB Wins
 U L Washington (1989, MGR)
Tony Womack (1991) MLB All-Star
 Kevin Young (1991)

Season records

References
Baseball Reference -Welland, Ontario

Defunct New York–Penn League teams
Sport in Welland
Baseball teams in Ontario
Defunct baseball teams in Canada
Pittsburgh Pirates minor league affiliates
1989 establishments in Ontario
1994 disestablishments in Ontario
Baseball teams established in 1989
Sports clubs disestablished in 1994